The Orphan Black Original Television Soundtrack is one of two soundtracks released on May 19, 2015 by Varèse Sarabande Records. It features music from the Canadian television series Orphan Black. The show was created by John Fawcett and Graeme Manson. Both soundtracks include a digital booklet when purchased with iTunes.

Track listing

References

2015 soundtrack albums
Orphan Black
Television soundtracks